Lieutenant General Olli-Matti Multamäki (April 18, 1948 - January 7, 2007) was the commander of the Finnish Army.

Career 
Born in Iitti, Multamäki graduated from Kadettikoulu, the Finnish military academy in 1971, and from Sotakorkeakoulu, the Finnish defence university in 1985. 
He has a M.Sc. degree in security strategy from the National Defense University of the United States.

He served with the United Nations Good Offices Mission in Afghanistan and Pakistan from 1988 to 1989, and as the military advisor to Lakhdar Brahimi, head of the United Nations Assistance Mission for Afghanistan in 2003.
In 2002 he served as the Senior National Representative and chief of the Finnish mission to the United States Central Command (USCENTCOM) in Tampa, Florida in the War on Terror.
He served as Deputy Military Representative to Nato and the European Union in 2004.

Multamäki served as the commander of the Pori Brigade from 1997 to 2000.
He was appointed the chief of the Finnish Army from August 1, 2004, and was promoted to Lieutenant General on December 6, 2006. Multamäki retired and was succeeded as commander of the Army on January 1, 2007 by Major General Ilkka Aspara. He died of a swift illness in Helsinki six days later.

References

External links 
 FDF communication
 Olli-Matti Multamäki at the Finnish Defence Forces site
 Prikaatikenraali Multamäki sotilasneuvonantajaksi Afganistaniin
 Kenraali- ja amiraaliylennykset 6.12.2006
 International Fellows Hall of Fame Program

1948 births
2007 deaths
People from Iitti
Finnish lieutenant generals